The Marijuana Freedom and Opportunity Act is legislation that was introduced in the 115 and 116th U.S. Congresses to remove cannabis from the Controlled Substances Act and to establish a Marijuana Opportunity Trust Fund. The legislation was sponsored by U.S. Senator Chuck Schumer, minority leader at the time, and Representative Hakeem Jeffries.

References

External link
Senate Bill 1552
 

2019 cannabis law reform
Proposed legislation of the 115th United States Congress
Proposed legislation of the 116th United States Congress